Mithan Kot railway station is  located in city of Mithankot in Rajanpur District, Punjab,  Pakistan.

See also
 List of railway stations in Pakistan
 Pakistan Railways

References

External links

Railway stations in Dera Ghazi Khan District
Railway stations on Kotri–Attock Railway Line (ML 2)
Rajanpur District